Tom Saxhaug (born February 22, 1948) is a Minnesota politician and former member of the Minnesota Senate. A member of the Minnesota Democratic–Farmer–Labor Party (DFL), he represented District 5, which included portions of Beltrami, Cass, Hubbard, and Itasca counties in the northern part of the state.

Early life, education, and career
Saxhaug completed his secondary education at Grand Rapids High School in Grand Rapids and later received a B.A. from St. Olaf College in Northfield. Prior to his election to the Senate, he served on the Grand Rapids City Council from 1995 to 1997, and was an Itasca County Commissioner from 1997 to 2003. He is a retired insurance agent.

Minnesota Senate
Saxhaug was first elected in 2002, and was re-elected in 2006, 2010, and 2012. Following redistricting in 2012, Saxhaug was placed in District 5 alongside Republican Senator John Carlson. Saxhaug defeated Carlson on November 6, 2012. He lost re-election to Republican Justin Eichorn in 2016.

Electoral history

Personal life
Saxhaug and his wife, Nancy, have two children.  Son Tim is a member of Bluegrass band Trampled by Turtles.

References

External links

Minnesota Public Radio Votetracker: Senator Tom Saxhaug

Democratic Party Minnesota state senators
1948 births
Living people
People from Grand Rapids, Minnesota
St. Olaf College alumni
21st-century American politicians